Tarah Lynne Schaeffer (born July 4, 1984) is a former American child actress. She is known for her role as Tarah on Sesame Street.

Acting career
In 1993, Sesame Street was casting for a child actor to play a character with disabilities for at least five episodes. Schaeffer's wheelchair sports coach recommended that she audition. Schaeffer had been on the Newington Children's Hospital's award-winning Cruisers wheelchair athletic team, and she impressed the show's producers with her wheelchair racing skills and other modified track and field talents. Schaeffer was cast as the first Sesame Street cast member with disabilities. 

Sesame Street writer Emily Perl Kingsley was a strong supporter of Schaeffer's inclusion in the cast. Kingsley's episode "Tarah's Ballet", which features a wheelchair dance, gained her a Grand EDI. Kingsley also drafted many guests with disabilities, such as Itzhak Perlman and the Little Theater of the Deaf. The integration of Schaeffer exemplified Kingsley's views:

Schaeffer appeared on Sesame Street for eight seasons. She became featured in the scripts more and more, and at times would travel two or three times a week from Connecticut to the studio in New York City. When her family moved to Reading, Pennsylvania in the late 1990s, the trip to New York became more difficult, and both Tarah and her family felt it was time to move on.

A 2000 Sesame Workshop newsletter mentioned Tarah's inclusion in the cast as one of the top ten significant ways Sesame Street has encouraged diversity:

Personal life
Schaeffer was raised in Plainville, Connecticut. She was born with osteogenesis imperfecta. Schaeffer graduated from Daniel Boone High School in 2002 and, as of September 2021, is a freelance writer and Twitch streamer under the name Mightymidge.

Filmography
Sesame Street Stays Up Late! (1993) (Tarah, uncredited)
Sesame Street: Elmocize (1996) (Tarah)
Kids' Guide to Life: Learning to Share (1996) (Tarah)
Sesame Street (1993–2001)

References

External links
 

People with osteogenesis imperfecta
Living people
American television actresses
20th-century American actresses
American child actresses
1984 births
21st-century American women
Actors from Waterbury, Connecticut